Mark Stahl (born 28 August 1953) is an American former professional soccer player. He played as a defender in the North American Soccer League and the Major Indoor Soccer League from 1975 to 1980.

Playing career
Stahl was born in San Francisco, California and graduated from St. Ignatius College Preparatory.  In 1975, he signed with the San Antonio Thunder of the North American Soccer League.  Stahl moved with the team when it became Team Hawaii in 1977.  In 1978, he moved to the Houston Hurricane where he played three seasons  In the fall of 1978, the Houston Summit became a charter member of the Major Indoor Soccer League.  The team drew most of its players, including Stahl, from the Hurricane.  On December 28, 1979, he went on loan from the Hurricane to the Pittsburgh Spirit for the 1979-1980 MISL season.

References

External links
 NASL stats

1953 births
Living people
American soccer players
Houston Hurricane players
Houston Summit players
Major Indoor Soccer League (1978–1992) players
North American Soccer League (1968–1984) players
North American Soccer League (1968–1984) indoor players
San Antonio Thunder players
Team Hawaii players
Pittsburgh Spirit players
Soccer players from San Francisco
Association football defenders